Pandoflabella tresaina is a species of snout moth in the genus Pandoflabella. It is found in French Guiana.

References

Moths described in 1922
Epipaschiinae